The 1921 Colorado Agricultural Aggies football team represented Colorado Agricultural College (now known as Colorado State University) in the Rocky Mountain Conference (RMC) during the 1921 college football season.  In their 11th season under head coach Harry W. Hughes, the Aggies compiled a 2–3–1 record (2–2–1 against conference opponents), tied for fourth place in the RMC, and outscored all opponents by a total of 108 to 66.

Schedule

References

Colorado Agricultural
Colorado State Rams football seasons
Colorado Agricultural Aggies football